Sturgeon Lake is a lake in north-western Alberta, Canada. It is located in the hydrographic basin of the Little Smoky River at an elevation of 685 m, 20 km west of the town of Valleyview, along Highway 43.

Young's Point Provincial Park is located on the northern shore of the lake, and Williamson Provincial Park lies on the southern shore. The Sturgeon Lake First Nations reserve of the Sturgeon Lake Cree Nation is established on the southern shore. The hamlet of Sturgeon Heights is located at the western tip of the lake.

Just near Williamson Provincial Park is the Sturgeon Lake Campground.  Sturgeon Lake Campground is a co-operative effort between M. Isley Enterprises Inc. and the Sturgeon Lake Cree Nation.  It has been recently revitalized with all new washroom facilities, 50 power and water sites, 54 non-serviced sites, a group campsite, a brand new store and a playground for the kids.  The campground is also the site of a giant teepee with beautiful artwork emblazoned on its sides.  It is also the site of Sturgeon Lake Cree Nation Pow Wow Arbour.  The arbour is where the ceremonial dances of the Sturgeon Lake Cree Nation are performed.

Despite the name, the lake doesn't host any Sturgeon fish.

Recreation
Sturgeon lake offers a variety of recreations opportunities.  A variety of fish are available consisting of Pickerel (Walleye), Jackfish (Northern Pike), Perch, Burbot (Lingcod), White suckers & White-fish.

Boat launch sites are located on both south and north shores, as are campgrounds and day use areas.

References

Municipal District of Greenview No. 16
Lakes of Alberta
Hudson's Bay Company trading posts